DYXY (99.1 FM) RMN Tacloban is a radio station owned and operated by Radio Mindanao Network. The station's studio and transmitter are located at #181 Goldtrade Bldg., P. Burgos St., Tacloban. The station operates 3:30 AM to 11 PM.

History
DYXY was launched in 1978, carrying a CHR/Top 40 format in the frequency of 93.9 MHz. Its studio was located in P. Burgos, Tacloban City, while its transmitter was located in Magsaysay Boulevard, Tacloban City (sharing its transmitter with RMN DYHT 711 kHz (launched by 1989 however went defunct by circa 2002). The station's transmitting power is 5 kW (10 kW ERP). By 1980, it moved to 99.1 MHz (the same frequency for DXVM).

On August 16, 1992, DYXY was rebranded as Smile Radio 99.1 and switched to a mass-based format. On November 23, 1999, the station switched back to a CHR/Top 40 station and rebranded as 991 XYFM, with its slogan, "Live It Up!", competing with 91.1 Love Radio, 95.1 Star FM (now Bombo Radyo 95.1), Magik FM 98.3 and 95.5 Hot Radio (now 95.9 Yes FM and then went inactive).

On May 16, 2002, the station was relaunched as 99.1 iFM and brought back its mass-based format. With that, it features an upgraded 5 kW transmitter (27 kW ERP) for clearer signal and the station revamp the slogan, "Hit after hit, iFM" trying to compete against the dominating MOR 94.3 (now Radyo Kidlat 94.3 in Ormoc).

On March 2, 2009, as part of RMN's nationwide expansion through the Radyo Mo Nationwide network, iFM changed its new logo and the slogan Sa iFM, Siguradong Enjoy Ka! (At iFM, You Will Surely Be Enjoyed!).

On November 9, 2015, iFM launched its new logo and slogan "Ang Bestfriend Mo!".

In January 2017, the station was reformatted into a music and news/talk format under the name RMN Tacloban. Also, iFM used as its station ID and bumpers. This marked the return of the RMN brand in Tacloban formerly held by the now-defunct DYHT-AM this time on the FM band. It is the network's second FM station to relaunch as a music and news/talk-formatted station after DWNX in Naga, Camarines Sur.
However by 2020, due to pandemic, the station reduced to 16 hours meanwhile implement automated music while the newscaster is doing a virtual newscast. But later when the cases in Tacloban City reduced, it return to music/news habit while in mid-2022 it return to 3:30 AM-11 PM habit. It also launch the program, Dear iFM along with other iFM stations. By 2023, the stations operate 24/7 except sign off every Sunday/Holy Week for transmitter maintenance.

References

News and talk radio stations in the Philippines
Radio stations established in 1978
Radio stations in Tacloban